The Girl on a Swing may refer to:
 The Girl on a Swing (1926 film), by Felix Basch
 The Girl in a Swing (novel) (1980), by Richard Adams
 The Girl in a Swing (1988 film), by Gordon Hessler
 "Girl on a Swing", song by Gerry and the Pacemakers